Mamata Thapa (born 13 September 1991) is a Nepalese wicketkeeper and Right-hand bat woman of Nepali National Cricket team.

References

1991 births
Living people
Nepalese women cricketers
Cricketers at the 2010 Asian Games
Cricketers at the 2014 Asian Games
Asian Games competitors for Nepal
Wicket-keepers